The Flower of Hawaii is a 1933 German musical film directed by Richard Oswald and starring Mártha Eggerth and Iván Petrovich. The film was shot at the Tempelhof Studios in Berlin with sets designed by the art director Franz Schroedter. Location shooting took place on the French Riviera. It is an adaptation of the operetta The Flower of Hawaii by Paul Abraham. The operetta was later adapted again for a 1953 film. It is based on the life of the last Queen of Hawaii, Liliuokalani.

Plot 
Susanne Lamond, who earns her living as a simple cigarette saleswoman in a cabaret in Paris, does not know that she is in fact a Hawaiian princess named Laya. The attaché Stone from the United States falls in love with her and follows her when Liberation Movement agents lure her to Hawaii with an alleged offer to perform as an artist. Here, according to the plans of the Hawaiian nationalists, she is to be married to a prince, the pretender to the throne, Lilo Taro.

However, US Governor Harrison has other political plans in mind and plans to marry the prince to his niece Bessy to further support US claims to the Pacific Islands. However, Bessy loves Harrison's secretary, Buffy. When the conspirators kidnap Susanne to the old royal castle, where a big wedding ceremony is to take place, Susanne objects. She has long since fallen in love with the smart American and they both want to get married. She renounces all claims to the throne and titles and follows him. Eventually Bessy and Buffy become a couple too.

Cast
Martha Eggerth as Susanne Lamond
Hans Fidesser as Lilo Taro
Iván Petrovich as Captain Harald Stone
Hans Junkermann as Governor Harrison
Baby Gray as Bessy
Ernő Verebes as Buffy, secretary
Fritz Fischer as Jim Boy
Ferdinand Hart as Kanako Hilo
Eugen Rex as Kililo
Carl Auen as Captain Taylor
Georg John as Chief Priest of Hawaii
Louis Brody

Notes

Bibliography 
 Klaus, Ulrich J. Deutsche Tonfilme: Jahrgang 1933. Klaus-Archiv, 1988.

External links

1930s historical musical films
German historical musical films
Films of the Weimar Republic
Films directed by Richard Oswald
Films set in Hawaii
Films set in the 1890s
Films based on operettas
Operetta films
German black-and-white films
Films scored by Paul Abraham
1930s German films
Films shot in France
Films set in Paris
Films shot at Tempelhof Studios